Some consider that a French bowline is the same as a Portuguese bowline, i.e. a bowline with two loops that can be used as a bosun's chair.

A different knot is however also known as a French bowline.

This form of bowline is similar to a standard bowline but there are several loops so that there is less likelihood of damage to a delicate object secured by the bowline. As with a standard bowline, the knot cannot tighten. Pressure is distributed over a wider area than in the case of a standard bowline.
The main advantage of this method is that the knot can be tied with one hand.

A convenient way to tie a French bowline can be:

Loop knots